Daniel, Dan or Danny Lewis may refer to:

 Dan Lewis (rugby league), rugby league footballer who played in the 1900s and 1910s for Wales, Welsh League XIII, and Merthyr Tydfil
 Dan Lewis (footballer) (1902–1965), Welsh football goalkeeper
 Daniel Lewis (conductor) (1925–2017), American orchestral conductor
 Dan Lewis (American football) (1936–2015), American football running back
 Daniel Lewis (choreographer) (born 1944), choreographer and author, and Dean of Dance at the New World School of the Arts
 Dan Lewis (newsreader) (born 1950), newsreader for KOMO-TV, Seattle, since 1987
 Daniel Vee Lewis (born 1959), American musician and bassist for World Entertainment War
 Danny Lewis (basketball) (born 1970), American basketball player
 Daniel Lewis (volleyball) (born 1976), Canadian volleyball player
 Daniel Lewis (footballer) (born 1982), English footballer
 Daniel Lewis (triple jumper) (born 1989), English athlete
 Daniel James Lewis or Jim Lewis (footballer, born 1909)  (1909–1980), Welsh footballer
 Daniel Lewis (boxer) (born 1993), Australian boxer
 Danny J Lewis, English house and garage producer
 Dan Lewis (Doctor Who), fictional character played by John Bishop

See also
 Daniel Louis (born 1953), Canadian film producer
 Daniel Day-Lewis (born 1957), actor
 Daniel Lewis Lee (1973–2020), American white supremacist and convicted murderer